Blowin' Up the Machine is the second album by the heavy metal band Meldrum, featuring a modified lineup compared to that of their 2001 debut Loaded Mental Cannon. The album features a guest appearance by Motörhead vocalist/bassist Lemmy, along with guitarist/founder Michelle Meldrum's long-time friends Gene Hoglan (of Strapping Young Lad and Dethklok) and Linda McDonald (of Phantom Blue and The Iron Maidens). A music video for "Purge" was released to promote the album.

This was the band's last album to be released while Michelle Meldrum was still alive. On May 21, 2008, she died of a cerebral hemorrhage caused by a cystic growth that restricted the flow of blood and oxygen in her brain.

Track listing

Personnel

Band members
Michelle Meldrum – guitar, engineer, mixing, executive producer
Moa Holmsten - lead vocals, producer
Frida Ståhl - bass, backing vocals on track 10, engineer, producer

Additional musicians
Lemmy - vocals on track 6
Gene Hoglan - drums on tracks 1, 2, 5, 8
Linda McDonald - drums on tracks 3, 4, 6, 7, 9, 10, 11

Production
Brett Chassen - engineer, mixing
Tony Naima - engineer
Bob Kulick - mixing
Toby Wright - mixing of tracks 7, 9, 10

References

External links 

2007 albums
Meldrum albums
Frontiers Records albums